Mikkel Andersen may refer to:

 Mikkel Andersen (footballer) (born 1988), Danish football goalkeeper
 Mikkel Andersen (physicist), physicist in New Zealand
 Mikkel B. Andersen (born 1998), Danish speedway rider
 Mikkel Andersen (born 2008), Danish speedway rider